Bossongri may refer to these places in Burkina Faso:
Bossongri, Bilanga
Bossongri, Thion